= Sagoniya =

- village
- Location within Madhya Pradesh Location within India
- Coordinates: 23.4220831°N 77.3640257°E
- Country: India
- State: Madhya Pradesh
- District: Bhopal
- Tehsil: Huzur
- Elevation: 493 m (1,617 ft)

Population (2011)
  - Total: 344
- Time zone: UTC+5:30 (IST)
- ISO 3166 code: MP-IN
- 2011 census code: 482379

Sagoniya is a village in the Bhopal district of Madhya Pradesh, India. It is located in the Huzur tehsil and the Phanda block.

== Demographics ==
According to the 2011 census of India, Sagoniya has 80 households. The effective literacy rate (i.e. the literacy rate of population excluding children aged 6 and below) is 60.07%.

Demographics (2011 Census)
	Total	Male	Female
Population	344	175	169
Children aged below 6 years	61	27	34
Scheduled caste	10	7	3
Scheduled tribe	0	0	0
Literates	170	108	62
Workers (all)	151	88	63
Main workers (total)	123	83	40
Main workers: Cultivators	42	38	4
Main workers: Agricultural labourers	78	43	35
Main workers: Household industry workers	2	2	0
Main workers: Other	1	0	1
Marginal workers (total)	28	5	23
Marginal workers: Cultivators	6	1	5
Marginal workers: Agricultural labourers	21	4	17
Marginal workers: Household industry workers	1	0	1
Marginal workers: Others	0	0	0
Non-workers	193	87	106
